Dieter Fritzsche is a retired slalom canoeist who competed for East Germany in the mid-1950s. He won a silver medal in the C-1 team event at the 1955 ICF Canoe Slalom World Championships in Tacen.

References

German male canoeists
Possibly living people
Year of birth missing (living people)
Medalists at the ICF Canoe Slalom World Championships